The Narrowsburg–Darbytown Bridge is an arch under bridge spanning the Delaware River between Darbytown, Pennsylvania and Narrowsburg, New York. It carries Pennsylvania Route 652 and New York State Route 52. Narrowsburg is located in the town of Tusten, but the hamlet along the river's edge is known as Narrowsburg because it is the narrowest part of the River.

The rates of passage were 37 ½ cents for a one-horse wagon, $1 for 4 horses, and 6 cents for a person walking: to put this in perspective, a good laborer could earn one dollar for a full day's work (12–15 hours). The bridge became part of a transportation system, which included the Mount Hope–Lumberland Turnpike, chartered in 1812. This pike ran from Orange County, New York to Honesdale, Pennsylvania and in many places was reinforced by a plank road. Ice and high water apparently took out at least two bridges before 1848.

In 1899, the Oswego Bridge Company constructed an iron structure, which lasted until the present interstate bridge was completed in 1954. It was not until January 12, 1927, that the bridge became toll free, after being purchased by the New York-Pennsylvania Joint Bridge Commission for $55,000.

In 2013, the bridge underwent emergency repairs that were estimated between $200,000 and $250,000. There were also plans announced for the middle of 2017 into 2018 to make structural repairs and paving work. Those plans for repairs, repaving and repainting were done in 2018.

See also 
 List of crossings of the Delaware River
 New York–Pennsylvania Joint Interstate Bridge Commission

References

External links 
 

Bridges over the Delaware River
Former toll bridges in New York (state)
Former toll bridges in Pennsylvania
Road bridges in Pennsylvania
Road bridges in New York (state)
Landmarks in Pennsylvania
Landmarks in New York (state)
Oswego Bridge Company
Open-spandrel deck arch bridges in the United States
Steel bridges in the United States
Bridges in Sullivan County, New York
Transportation buildings and structures in Wayne County, Pennsylvania
New York–Pennsylvania Joint Interstate Bridge Commission